Jungle Rot is an American death metal band from Kenosha, Wisconsin, formed in 1992.

History 
Jungle Rot was founded in 1992 as a side project by Jim Harte and Joe Thomas, members of the Illinois thrash metal act, Prisoner. The band's name refers to jungle rot, an infection of the skin that occurs in tropical climates. The band recorded their first demo Rip Off Your Face, a fun offering of immature death metal heavily influenced by the likes of S.O.D. and Celtic Frost. Then, they acquired Kenosha-based guitarist Dave Matrise (Num Skull, Nocturnal, Fatal Violence) in 1993. It was not until 1994 when Matrise took over that the band got serious and started to take off. The band refined their style and released their second demo Skin The Living in 1995, which is the year Matrise acknowledges the band began.

After their first two demos, the band was signed to the American independent label Pure Death Records, owned at the time by Jamey Jasta of Hatebreed, where they released their first album, a repackaging of their second demo Skin the Living, in 1996. In late 1997, their second album, Slaughter the Weak was released on independent label Pulverizer Records.

The EP Darkness Foretold was released in 1998 by the small label S.O.D. Records, which was spearheaded by the creator of the underground music magazine Sounds of Death, and featured covers of Slayer's "Fight Til Death" and Carnivore's "Jesus Hitler". The initial pressing of Darkness Foretold came with a limited edition Jungle Rot Comic Book. The next two full-length studio albums, 2001's Dead And Buried and 2004's Fueled By Hate were released by Olympic Recordings in partnership with Century Media Records.

In 2005, the current core of Jungle Rot came together when Matrise enlisted the talents of Chicago native James Genenz (Fleshgrind, Avernus, Dead For Days, Reign Inferno, God Dementia) on bass guitar and Geoff Bub (Destiss, Putrid Dissentary) on guitar. With songwriting duties now shared between the three members, and the bulk of the lyrics being forthwith written by Genenz, Matrise was now able to take his band to the next level.

Subsequent touring ensued with bands like Deicide, Goatwhore, Cattle Decapitation, Krisiun, The Black Dahlia Murder, 25 Ta Life, Hate Eternal, Incantation, and Vital Remains. In mid-2006, the band released the album Warzone on Crash Music. This recording marked the first album to feature the now current Jungle Rot core of Matrise, Genenz, and Bub. In 2008, they headlined a European tour with support from Warmaster, Downswitch, and Walking Corpse.

The band signed with Napalm Records in January 2009 and released What Horrors Await in June 2009. A European tour with Six Feet Under followed shortly thereafter along with a headlining run across the United States. In April 2011, the band signed with Victory Records and released Kill on Command on June 21, 2011. On March 19, 2013, Jungle Rot released their eighth album through Victory Records, titled Terror Regime. The band went on tour to support the album with metal groups including Suffocation, Obituary, Broken Hope and Decrepit Birth.

On April 14, 2015, it was announced that Jungle Rot would be playing the entirety of the 2015 Rockstar Energy Drink Mayhem Festival, performing on the Victory Records stage.

In early 2015 the band played the prestigious 70000 Tons of Metal cruise, and announced via their social media that they were working on their ninth studio album, Order Shall Prevail, to be released later in the year on Victory Records. Pre-orders for the album were announced on May 26, along with the album's track listing, release date of June 30, and a stream for the single "Paralyzed Prey." On May 27, 2015, it was revealed that Max Cavalera (Sepultura, Soulfly, Cavalera Conspiracy) would be lending his vocals on the track "Fight Where You Stand". On June 29 the official music video for the single "Paralyzed Prey" premiered on Vevo.

On March 7, 2016, Jungle Rot released a video for the track "Doomsday" via Victory Records. The band was also announced as part of the 2016 edition of the Metal Alliance Tour alongside Dying Fetus and The Acacia Strain.

In the summer of 2017, Jungle Rot completed a successful US and Canada tour with legendary German thrash band Destruction and California's Warbringer, performed in Central America, headlining shows in Nicaragua, Costa Rica, Guatemala, and Mexico; and announced that they would be entering the studio in January 2018 to record their 10th studio album to be released in mid-2018. It was also revealed that former drummer Jesse Beahler would perform the drums on this new album.

On June 8, 2018, the band announced the upcoming release of their self-titled tenth album. Two singles were released in June 2018: "A Burning Cinder" and "Fearmonger", the latter featuring guest vocal contributions from Destruction frontman Schmier. The album was released on Digipak CD, vinyl, and limited cassette on July 20, 2018.

Later in June 2018, bassist/lyricist James Genenz was assaulted by a group of individuals during the late night hours outside his place of employment which left him with multiple injuries including a shattered ankle. After 2 surgeries, James was forced to sit out of the entirety of touring for the remainder of 2018 which included a North American jaunt with Havok and Extinction AD. In the spring of 2019, James regrouped with the band and they hit the road starting in Europe with a headlining tour with openers Ultra-Violence, where the band played through Austria, Slovakia, Italy, Switzerland, Germany, Belgium, Great Britain and Holland. Jungle Rot returned to the states and immediately hit the road with Deicide, Origin, and The Absence for another month before turning around and heading back to Europe for a few weeks. During this run Jungle Rot performed headlining shows in Holland, Sweden, Poland, Germany, France, Hungary, Czech Republic and made appearances at the metal festivals Brutal Assault, Party San Open Air, Stonehenge Festival, and Poet Fest. Jungle Rot returned home and performed at the Full Terror Assault Festival in Illinois and a hometown show before beginning to work on their next album.

Spenser Syphers was announced as the new permanent drummer for Jungle Rot in June 2019.

On March 22, 2022, the band announced their eleventh album, A Call to Arms, would be released on May 13.

Style 
Jungle Rot plays an aggressive style of groovy death metal and are known to integrate groovy riffs into their death metal style. Most of the lyrical subjects deal with war, torture, murder, death, and corruption.

Personnel 

Current
Dave Matrise – rhythm guitar, vocals (1994–present)
James Genenz – bass (2005–present), guitars (2004–2005)
Geoff Bub – lead guitar (2005–present)
Spenser Syphers – drums (2019–present)

Former
Joe Carlino – bass (1993–1994)
Brian Kuhn – bass (1994–1995)
Mike LeGros – bass (1999–2000)
Jim Garcia – drums (1999–2002)
Joe Thomas – vocals, guitars (1992–1994)
Chris "Wisco" Djuricic – bass (1995–1999, 2001–2003), guitars (2004)
Jim Harte – bass (1992–1997)
Jim Bell – guitars (1994–2000)
Rob Pandola – drums (1997–1998)
Kevin Forsythe – guitars (2000–2002)
Jerry Sturino – bass (2004–2005)
Eric House – drums (2004–2006 / 2008–2010)
Joey Lohr – guitars (2004–2005)
Neil Zacharek – drums (2006–2007)
Jesse Beahler – drums (2010–2013)

Touring musicians
Jason Adam Borton – drums (2016)
Remington Roberts – drums (2013–2016)
Parker Yowell – drums (2016)
Mike Miczek – drums (2014)
Shawn Johnson – drums (1999)
Tony Ochoa – drums (2010)
Andy Vehnekamp – drums (1999)
Joey Muha – drums (2015)
Scott Fuller – drums (2013)
Chris 'Wisco' Djuricic – guitars (2013)

Discography

Studio albums 
 Skin the Living (1996, Pure Death Records)
 Slaughter the Weak (1997, Pulverizer Records)
 Dead and Buried (2001, Olympic/Century Media)
 Fueled by Hate (2004, Olympic/Century Media)
 Warzone (2006, Crash Music Inc.)
 What Horrors Await (2009, Napalm Records) (reissued by Victory Records, 2018)
 Kill on Command (2011, Victory Records)
 Terror Regime (2013, Victory Records)
 Order Shall Prevail (2015, Victory Records)
 Jungle Rot (2018, Victory Records)
 A Call to Arms (2022, Unique Leader Records)

Demos and EPs 
 Rip Off Your Face (1993)
 Skin the Living (1995)
 4-tracks promo (1997)
 Darkness Foretold (1998, S.O.D. Records/Crash Music Inc.)

Singles 
 "Rise Up And Revolt" (2011, Victory Records)
 "Paralyzed Prey" (2015, Victory Records)
 "Fight Where You Stand" (feat. Max Cavalera) (2015, Victory Records)
 "Speed Freak" Hallows Eve cover (2016, Victory Records)
 "Fearmonger (feat. Schmier)" (2018, Victory Records)
 "A Burning Cinder" (2018, Victory Records)

 DVDs 
 Live in Germany (2006, Crash Music, Inc.)

 Music videos 
 "Victims Of Violence" (2006, directed by Dave Paul)
 "Worst Case Scenario" (2010, directed by Jason Meudt & Emmett Austin)
 "Rise Up And Revolt" (2011, directed by Eric Richter)
 "Blood Ties" (2012, directed by Eric Richter)
 "Blind Devotion" (2013, directed by Eric Richter)
 "Terror Regime" (2013, directed by Eric Richter)
 "Carpet Bombing" (2013, directed by Eric Richter)
 "Utter Chaos" (2013, directed by Eric Richter)
 "Ruthless Omnipotence" (2013, directed by Eric Richter)
 "Paralyzed Prey" (2015, directed by Dustin Smith)
 "Doomsday" (2016, directed by Dustin Smith)
 "The Unstoppable" (2018, directed by Dustin Smith)
 "A Burning Cinder" (2018, directed by Dustin Smith)
 "Send Forth Oblivion" (2018, directed by Dustin Smith)
 "A Call to Arms" (2022)

 Compilation appearances 
 Darkness Foretold appeared on "Sampler #12" (CD, Pulverised Records / S.O.D. Magazine, 1998)
 Fight Till Death (Slayer cover) appeared on "Straight to Hell: A Tribute to Slayer" (CD, Cleopatra/Deadline, 1999)
 Left For Dead appeared on "Road Kill Vol. 2" (CD, Pavement Music, 1999)
 Tomb Of Armenus appeared on "Deftone 2/99" (CD, Deftone Magazine, Feb 1999)
 Darkness Foretold appeared on "The Morbid One" (CD, Morbid Records, 1999)
 Humans Shall Pay appeared on "Fire on the Brain – Volume 1" (CD, Olympic, 2001)
 Face Down appeared on "Metal for the Masses Vol. 3" (2×CD, Century Media Records, 2004)
 Butchering Death appeared on "Dreaded Compilation Vol. Sicks" (Cassette tape, Copremesis Records)
 Gorebag'' appeared on "Death Metal Legends" (CD, Pavement Music, 2008)

References

External links 
Official website
Official band profile at Victory Records

American death metal musical groups
Musical groups established in 1994
Heavy metal musical groups from Wisconsin
American musical trios
Musical groups from Wisconsin
Season of Mist artists
Victory Records artists
1994 establishments in Wisconsin